Leonce Raphael Agbodjelou is a photographer from Benin.

Biography 
Leonce Raphael Agbodjelou was born in Porto-Novo in 1965. He is the son of Benin photographer Joseph Moise Agbodjelou (1912-2000). He does not have a formal education and was trained by his father. They were traveled together with portable studio. They used a traditional colorful fabrics as a background for the people portraits they made. Leonce Agbodjelou founded the first Photography School in Benin. He serves as the President of the Photographer's Association of Porto-Novo.

Work 
Agbodjelou's portraiture series, Citizens of Porto-Novo depicts people of Benin's capital. He is using a daylight studio and a medium format film camera for the project. His 'Musclemen' shows staged studio photograph of muscular men, which is popular theme in the West Africa. The 'Egungun' project are photographs of the masqueraders, depicting divine ancestors of Yoruba-speaking people. They usually appear at funerals to guide deceased to the spirit world. They can also appear at any time to protect people from misfortunes.

Exhibitions

Solo 
 2011 Egungun Project. A Sumptuous Masquerade, Jack Bell Gallery, London
 2015 Egungun Masquerades, SMAC Gallery, Cape Town, South Africa
 2017 The Egungun Project: One man show, Kleinschmidt Fine Photographs, Wiesbaden

Group 
 2013 Native Nostalgia, Museum of African Design, Johannesburg
 2013 Taylor Wessing Photographic Portrait Prize 2013, National Portrait Gallery, London
 2015 Staring Back: The Creation and Legacy of Picasso's Demoiselles d'Avignon, Fleming Museum of Art
 2015 Disguise: Masks and Global African Art, Seattle Art Museum
 2016 Disguise: Masks and Global African Art, Brooklyn Museum
 2017 Regarding Africa, Tel Aviv Museum of Art
 2017 African-Print Fashion Now!, Fowler Museum at UCLA
2020 Through an African Lens: Sub-Saharan Photography from the Museum's Collection, The Museum of Fine Arts, Houston, Houston, Texas

Collections 
Leonce Raphael Agbodjelou works are in public collections around the world, including Zurich Museum of Art, Pitt Rivers Museum in Oxford, Saatchi Collection in London, Carnegie Museum of Art, Zeitz Museum of Contemporary Art Africa in Cape Town and Museum of Modern Art in Equatorial Guinea.

References 

Beninese photographers
1965 births
Living people